Ding Jiali (born 16 December 1959) is a Chinese actress.

Her career accolades include two Plum Blossom Prizes and Golden Rooster Awards, a Hundred Flowers Award, Flying Apsaras Award, Huabiao Award, Golden Phoenix Award, Chinese Film Media Award and Splendor Award.

Life

Early life
Ding was born in 1959 in Jiamusi, Heilongjiang, she graduated from Shanghai Theatre Academy, majoring in acting. After graduating she was assigned to the National Theatre Company of China, where she met her first boyfriend.

Acting career
Ding had her first experience in front of the camera in 1986, and she was chosen to act as "Xiaobaixie" in Wang Junzheng's film A Woman In the Mountains, for which she won the "Best Supporting Actress" award at the 7th Golden Rooster Awards. At the same year, she won the 3rd Plum Blossom Prize.

In 1992, Ding won the "Best Supporting Actress" at the 12th Golden Rooster Awards for her performance in Spring Festival.

In 1993, Ding played the role of Han Liting in Xia Gang's film No More Applause, for which she received "Outstanding Actress" award and "Best Supporting Actress" award at the 2nd Beijing College Student Film Festival and 17th Hundred Flowers Awards respectively.

In 1999, Ding won the Golden Phoenix Award for her performance in The Red Card, and won the "Outstanding Actress" award at the 19th Flying Apsaras Awards for her performance in Love Unspoken. One year later, Ding won the Splendor Award and the 17th Plum Blossom Prize.

In 2001, Ding acted in Lu Xuechang's film Cala, My Dog! as Yu Lan, alongside Ge You and Ha Yu; she was nominated for "Best Actress" award at the 26th Hundred Flowers Awards and the 4th Chinese Film Media Awards.

In 2006, Ding participated in The Lane Premier, a film directed by Li Qimin, which garnered her an "Outstanding Actress" award at the 12th Huabiao Awards and received nomination at the 8th Changchun Film Festival.

Personal life
Ding was married twice. Her first husband was Wu Guangchuan. In 1986, when she was pregnant she heard her husband had an affair. Their daughter Hu Duoduo was born in 1987, and in the same year, they divorced.

She remarried in 1990 and her second husband is a professor. Their son Guoguo was born in 1991,but the couple divorced in the same year.

Works

Film

Television

Awards

References

1959 births
People from Jiamusi
Actresses from Heilongjiang
Shanghai Theatre Academy alumni
Living people
20th-century Chinese actresses
21st-century Chinese actresses
Chinese stage actresses
Chinese film actresses
Chinese television actresses